Luis de Briceño (also Briçeño, Brizeño; fl. 1610s–1630s) was a Spanish guitarist and music theorist who introduced the Spanish guitar style in France, where previously only the lute was considered a serious plucked instrument. He travelled in high courtly circles in both countries, and is first cited as an authority on the Spanish guitar in 1614. His Metodo mui facilissimo para aprender a tañer la guitarra a lo español (1626, Very Easy Method to Learn to Play the Guitar in the Spanish Style) is the main source of knowledge of the Spanish style, since few books appeared during this period in Spain itself.

His own transcriptions include villanos, villancicos, pasacalles, tonos frances, españoletas, romances, folías, seguidillas and a "Danza de la Hacha". A selection were recorded by Le Poème Harmonique, directed by Vincent Dumestre, for Alpha/Outhere in 2011.

Links

Digital copy of "Metodo mui facilissimo..." at National Library in France
https://gallica.bnf.fr/ark:/12148/bpt6k1168966d.image

References

Spanish guitarists
Spanish male guitarists
Spanish music theorists
Year of birth missing
Year of death missing